The Ministry of the Interior of the Republic of Lithuania is charged with the oversight of public safety, border protection, migration control, emergency response, public administration and governance, the civil service, and local and regional development initiatives. Its operations are authorized by the Constitution of the Republic of Lithuania, decrees issued by the President and Prime Minister, and laws passed by the Seimas (Parliament). The current head of the ministry is Agnė Bilotaitė.

History 
In 1918, after the formation of the first Government of Lithuania, the Ministry of the Interior was also established. The ministry operated in Kaunas until 1940, when Soviet invasion of the Baltics occurred. On 26 August 1940, the People's Commissariat of Internal Affairs of the Lithuanian Soviet Socialist Republic was established, which, on 14 March 1946, became the Ministry of the Interior of the LSSR. It was subordinated to the Ministry of the Interior of the USSR and the Council of Ministers of the Lithuanian SSR. On 17 March 1990, the Government of the independent Republic of Lithuania was formed and the Ministry of the Interior was restored.

Structure 

 Migration Department
General Help Center
Department of Civil Protection
Financial Crime Investigation Service
Population Register Service
Department of Informatics and Communications
Police Department

 Fire Protection and Rescue Department
 Regional Development Department
 Investigation Department
 Fire Rescue School

 Management Security Department
 State Border Guard Service
 Civil Service Department
 Public Security Service

Institutions under the ministry

Lyceum 
The General Povilas Plechavicius Cadet Lyceum is a specialized state school based in Kaunas responsible for the training of young students. It serves under the Ministry of the Interior and Kaunas City Municipality. The school started its activities as a Young Warrior club in 1994, becoming the “Lūšiukai” school in 2005. In September 2012, the school was reformed from a non-formal educational institution. In 2013, the school was named General Povilas Plechavičius Cadet School and in 2015 it was named General Povilas Plechavičius Cadet Lyceum. Students from all cities and districts in Lithuania study at the lyceum. Pupils studying in lyceum generally go into higher education (General Jonas Žemaitis Military Academy of Lithuania and Mykolas Riomeris University), as well as professional military service.  In March 2018, the director of the lyceum was dismissed from office for a period of 3 months due to suspicions of abuse of office. In January 2021, Lithuanian military cadets were given a virtual tour of the American 2nd Battalion, 8th Cavalry Regiment.

Wind Orchestra 
Representative Wind Orchestra of the Ministry of the Interior is the only police band in Lithuania. It was first founded in 1935 as the wind orchestra of the Kaunas Police Department, led by Julius Radžiūnas as the first conductor. When Lithuania regained its independence, it was restored and resumed its activities under the direction of Algirdas Kazimieras Radzevičius. In 2008, the band was granted the status of a concert institution.

Ministers

References

 Ministry of the Interior of the Republic of Lithuania

External links 
 Legislation
 Regulations
 Public Administration

 
Lithuania
Internal affairs